Scaramuccia Trivulzio  (1465 – 3 August 1527) was a cardinal of the Catholic Church. He was Bishop of Como in Italy, from 1508 to 1518. He was then Bishop of Piacenza, from 1519 to 1525.

He was made cardinal in July 1517 by Pope Leo X. It was his fifth consistory.

References

External links

 

16th-century Italian cardinals
Bishops of Como
Bishops of Piacenza
Archbishops of Vienne
1465 births
1527 deaths
Scaramuccia
16th-century Italian Roman Catholic bishops